InLoox, Inc. is a company that develops and sells software for project planning, resource management, project document management, mind mapping, and project accounting. InLoox, Inc. is located in the San Francisco Bay Area, but the company headquarters are at InLoox GmbH in Munich, Germany.

Many other companies automate and streamline business processes with the use of Microsoft Outlook: SAP and Microsoft take a comparable approach with their joint venture "Duet", but InLoox claims to integrate the whole business process into Outlook.

InLoox stores ongoing projects in an SQL database. Versions earlier than 2007 (2. x–4.x) used Microsoft Exchange public folders or Personal Folders (.pst) files for data storage. Microsoft's announcements of moving away from Exchange public folders might have prompted the switch to SQL.

In 2012, InLoox started the SaaS solution InLoox now! The Cloud technology enables customers to use InLoox Web App even if they do not have their own server and without requiring software installation.

External links 
 www.inloox.com – Official English InLoox Website

References 

Microsoft Office
Project management software
Business software for Windows